Musir (foaled 2007) is an Australian-bred racehorse.

Background
Musir was sired by Redoute's Choice out of Dizzy de Lago a daughter of Encosta De Lago. He was trained by Mike de Kock (SA) and was owned by Mohammed bin Khalifa Al Maktoum

Racing career
Musir was a Group 1 winner in South Africa as two-year-old. In 2010 he won the UAE 2000 Guineas and the UAE Derby.

References
 Musir’s pedigree

2006 racehorse births
Racehorses bred in Australia
Racehorses trained in South Africa
Racehorses trained in the United Arab Emirates
Thoroughbred family 18